Saint-Pierre-des-Landes is a commune in the Mayenne department in north-western France.

Amenities: Small supermarket, boulangerie, infant school, dechetterie, repair garage, hairdresser, Mairie, fire station, small War Memorial, public toilets, small fishing lake

See also
Communes of the Mayenne department

References

Saintpierredeslandes